Cabrini Medical Center of New York City was created in 1973 by a merger of two Manhattan hospitals. It closed in 2008 due to financial difficulties cited by the Berger Commission, followed by a bankruptcy filing.

In January 2010, the five buildings formerly housing the medical center were purchased by Memorial Sloan-Kettering Cancer Center for $83.1 million, with plans to open an outpatient cancer facility; but in 2013 the buildings were sold to a developer to be converted into residences.

Columbus Hospital 
Columbus Hospital was founded in 1892 (the 400th anniversary of Columbus's voyage), incorporated in 1895, and formally opened on March 18, 1896, by the Missionary Sisters of the Sacred Heart of Jesus, to address the needs of Italian immigrants. The founding group included the now-canonized Mother Frances Xavier Cabrini, and among the first physicians of the hospital was George Frederick Shrady Sr.

The hospital was originally located in a former residence at 41 East 12th Street. In 1895 it moved to 226–228 East 20th Street, which had an approximate capacity of 100 beds. In 1913 it expanded again, acquiring "annex" facilities vacated by the New York Polyclinic Hospital at 214–218 East 34th Street.

Italian Hospital and merger 
Italian Hospital was founded in 1937 by the Italian Hospital Society, with the assets and the West 110th Street location of the defunct Parkway Hospital.

In July 1973, Columbus Hospital and Italian Hospital merged. The combined organization took the name Cabrini Health Care Center, after Mother Cabrini, and became a 490-bed facility located at 227 East 19th Street, between Second and Third Avenues near Gramercy Park. By 1976, it was using the name Cabrini Medical Center. In the 1980s, it was one of the earliest hospitals to develop expertise for the AIDS epidemic that became a leading cause of death in its neighborhood.

Financial difficulties and closure 

The Cabrini Medical Center website reported: "As of March 14, 2008, many of the services at Cabrini Medical Center are no longer available. ... The Emergency Department, acute inpatient units and most outpatient services are closed." The center closed permanently on March 16, 2008, due to financial difficulties that resulted in patients and staff seeking other health care and employment.

On July 10, 2009, Cabrini Medical Center filed for Chapter 11 bankruptcy, citing assets of $46 million and liabilities of $167 million. The top five secured creditors were the mortgage holder Sun Life Assurance Company of Canada ($35.1 million), Missionary Sisters of the Sacred Heart of Jesus in Chicago ($33 million), the New York branch of the Missionary Sisters ($18.7 million), Service Employees International Union National Benefits Fund ($5.1 million), and an affiliate of Saint Vincent's Catholic Medical Center ($4 million). The largest unsecured creditors were Consolidated Edison ($4.2 million), St. Vincent's ($3.2 million), and the Dormitory Authority of the State of New York ($2.6 million). Cabrini owed a $828,000 health facility assessment tax to New York State, $418,000 in fees to the New York State Department of Health, $412,000 in dues to the Healthcare Association of New York State, and $308,000 to Mount Sinai Hospital.

Medical staff residency training records and verification have become available through the Federation Credentials Verification Service.

References

Further reading
 

Defunct hospitals in Manhattan
Hospital buildings completed in 1895
Hospitals established in 1973
Hospitals disestablished in 2008
1973 establishments in New York City
2008 disestablishments in New York (state)
Catholic hospitals in North America